is the debut studio album by Japanese boy band Arashi. The album was released on January 24, 2001 in Japan under the record label Pony Canyon in two editions: a regular CD version containing a 32-page booklet and a limited version containing stickers and a deluxe box case. It was released digitally on February 7, 2020.

Singles
The album contains the singles "Arashi", which was used as the theme song for the band's mini-drama V no Arashi, "Sunrise Nippon", "Typhoon Generation" and "Kansha Kangeki Ame Arashi".

Commercial performance
The album debuted at number one on the Oricon chart with initial sales of 267,220 copies. Until the release of All the Best! 1999–2009, the album remained the group's best-selling album with overall sales of around 323,000 for nearly ten years.

Track listing

Charts and certifications

Weekly charts

Certifications

Release history

Footnotes

References

External links
 Product information 

Arashi albums
2001 albums
Pony Canyon albums